The Distichodontidae are a family of African freshwater fishes of the order Characiformes.

Two evolutionary grades are found in this family; micropredators (predators of very small organisms like aquatic insect larvae) and herbivores have a nonprotractile upper jaw and a deep to shallow body, while carnivores have a movable upper jaw and an elongated body. Although the herbivores primarily feed on plant material, these species often have omnivorous tendencies. The carnivores include specialized fish-eaters (genus Mesoborus), fin-eaters (Belonophago, Eugnathichthys and Phago) and species that will feed on both whole fish and fins (Ichthyborus). The fin-eaters attack other fish, even ones that are much larger, where they bite off pierces of fins with their sharp teeth.

Genera
The 17 genera include about 90 species:

 Genus Belonophago (two species)
 Genus Congocharax (two species)
 Genus Distichodus (23 species)
 Genus Dundocharax (one species)
 Genus Eugnathichthys (three species)
 Genus Hemigrammocharax (10 species)
 Genus Ichthyborus (four species)
 Genus Mesoborus (one species)
 Genus Microstomatichthyoborus (two species)
 Genus Monostichodus (three species) 
 Genus Nannaethiops (two species)
 Genus Nannocharax (28 species)
 Genus Neolebias (11 species)
 Genus Paradistichodus (one species)
 Genus Paraphago (one species)
 Genus Phago (three species)
 Genus Xenocharax (two species)

References